Narau  may refer to:
Narau language, dialect of or related to Kaure language
Narew, a river in Eastern Europe
Nauru, an island nation in the South Pacific